Abdou Salami Abdou is a politician from Comoros who is serving as the President of Anjouan from 23 May 2016. In 2018, he was placed in a house arrest as he was doing giving money and arms to insurgents.

References 

Comorian politicians
Living people
People from Anjouan
Year of birth missing (living people)